The term Folly Farm may refer to:

Buildings

in the United Kingdom
Folly Farm Adventure Park and Zoo, a park in Pembrokeshire, Wales
Folly Farm, Somerset, a farm and nature reserve in England
Folly Farm, Sulhamstead, a house in Berkshire, England
Folly Farm, a listed building in Lawshall, Suffolk, England
Folly Farm, Barnet, a popular recreation spot before the Second World War

in the United States
Folly Farm, an historic house associated with the Shrine of St. Anthony (Maryland)

Other
Folly Farm, a book by English philosopher C. E. M. Joad